Christine Marie Lundy, 38, and her 7-year-old daughter Amber Grace Lundy were murdered in Palmerston North, New Zealand, on 29 August 2000. In February 2001, after a six month investigation, Mark Edward Lundy (then aged 43), Christine's husband, was arrested and charged with the murders. At his trial, cell phone data proved Lundy was in Petone at 5.30pm and 8.28pm that night. The prosecution claimed the murders took place at about 7.00pm; that Lundy drove from Petone to Palmerston North, a distance of 134 Kilometres, killed his wife and daughter, disposed of his clothes and any other incriminating evidence, and drove another 134 kilometers back to Petone in between these times. In 2002 he was convicted of the murders after a six-week trial and was sentenced to life imprisonment with a minimum non-parole period of 17 years. He appealed the conviction to the Court of Appeal; the appeal was rejected and the court increased his non-parole period to 20 years. In June 2013 Lundy took his case to the Privy Council in Britain. In October 2013 the Privy Council quashed the convictions and ordered a re-trial. 

By 2015, the original scenario that Lundy had made the round trip between Petone and Palmerston North after 5.30pm, committed the murders and got back to Petone by 8.28pm was completely debunked. At the re-trial in 2015, police discarded this theory and presented an entirely different version of events. Nevertheless, in April 2015, Lundy was found guilty again. Lundy continued to claim he is innocent and in 2017 took his case to the Court of Appeal a second time. On 9 October 2018 the Court of Appeal released its decision to dismiss the appeal.

Background
Prior to the murders, Mark and Christine Lundy had been married for 17 years; Amber was their only child. They jointly owned a kitchen sink business. The company was often in debt to their supplier for around $100,000. In 1999, Mark Lundy added to their debt by buying two plots of land to grow grapes in Hawke's Bay on which he still owed more than NZ$2 million in 2000. The owners of the plots, Christopher Morrison and Douglas Twigg, told the court at Lundy's second trial that the sale went unconditional in early 2000. Lundy missed a number of settlement dates without paying, which lead to penalty interest of about 14%.

The final deadline was August 30, 2000 – the day his wife and daughter were found dead. A few months earlier, an insurance salesman reviewed the couple's life insurance and the Lundys agreed on an increase from $200,000 to $500,000 but the documentation had not been finalised at the time of Christine Lundy's death. The Crown alleged that Lundy intended to use Christine Lundy's life insurance to cover his mounting debts. After Christine's death, Tower Insurance paid $75,000 off the Lundy's mortgage but no cash payment was made.

Events on the day of the murders 
On the morning of Tuesday, 29 August, 2000, Lundy drove from Palmerston North to Wellington on one of his regular business trips. He checked into a motel in Petone at around 5:00 pm. His wife or daughter called him on his cell phone in Petone; Lundy said he was told during the call that they were going to McDonald's for dinner; the call ended at 5:43 pm. Police later found a McDonald's receipt in the Lundy home for food bought at 5.45pm.  Christine Lundy took a call at home from a friend just before 7 pm that night. 

Mark Lundy's cell phone records showed he made a call from Petone to a business partner of his Hawke's Bay wine-making venture at 8.28 pm. The computer at the Lundy home in Palmerston North was switched off at 10:52 pm. At 11:30 pm Lundy called an escort service in Petone from his motel. She left the motel at about 1 am.  At his first trial, the Police claimed the murders occurred in Palmerston North, two hours away by car, between 5.30pm and 8.28pm while these events were taking place. At his second trial, police alleged Lundy drove to Petone in the early hours of Wednesday 30 August after the escort went home.

At Lundy's retrial in 2015, Christine's brother testified that he went to the Lundy home the next morning to see Christine about a business matter. He said he entered through an open ranchslider and found the bodies of Christine and Amber bludgeoned to death. Christine's body was on her bed; Amber's was on the floor in the doorway of Christine's bedroom. Both had died of head injuries caused by multiple blows from what was determined to be a tomahawk-like weapon or small axe. No weapon was found. A rear window had been tampered with and had Christine's blood on it. A jewellery box was later determined to be missing.

Role of the media 
At the funeral, Lundy appeared so distressed, he had to be supported by a couple of friends. His overt grief was filmed and shown repeatedly on television. Many who viewed the footage, who didn't know him, thought he was faking.  Lundy’s lawyer, Jonathan Eaton QC, said whenever Lundy’s case was in the news, the funeral footage was shown. It made Lundy a pathetic, comedic figure. Eaton believes the image became ingrained in people’s minds, and that the constant replaying of scenes from the funeral inevitably affected the jury (at both trials) and had a serious effect on the outcome.

First trial
After a police investigation of six months, Lundy was arrested and charged with their murders. The trial took place in the High Court in Palmerston North.

Prosecution case
Four days before the murders, the Lundys increased their life insurance on the advice of their insurance broker.  Christine's cover was raised from $200,000 to $500,000. The prosecution contended that Lundy killed his wife for her life insurance money because of financial pressure, and killed his daughter because she was a witness. However, the policy documents had not been issued so the increase was not valid at the time of Christine’s death. 

The prosecution's case was also based on a speck of body tissue found on one of Lundy's polo shirts; the shirt was found along with other clothes and miscellaneous items on the back seat of his car. Although New Zealand pathologists could not identify it as Christine's brain tissue, a pathologist from Texas did.  The prosecution argued the only way this brain tissue could have got on the shirt was if Lundy himself was the murderer. Later reports and tests by other experts cast doubt upon the identification of the material as brain tissue.

No weapon was ever found, but paint found in the hair of victims matched the paint Lundy used to mark the tools in his toolshed.

The prosecution called more than 130 Crown witnesses.

Defence case
The defence called three witnesses including Lundy himself, who emphatically denied killing his wife and daughter. A key defence argument was that Lundy could not possibly have made the round trip from Wellington to Palmerston North and back in three hours, pointing out that Lundy's phone records prove that his phone was in Petone at 5:43 pm and at 8:48 pm. Regarding the brain tissue evidence, the defence noted that there was blood and tissue splattered everywhere including on the walls, the bed and the floor around the bodies but "his car, glasses, wedding ring, shoes and other clothes were all tested for blood or other tissue and absolutely nothing was found"; they said contamination could account for the tissue found on Lundy's shirt.

Verdict
The jury deliberated for seven hours before finding Lundy guilty of the murder of his wife and child. He was sentenced to life in prison with a minimum non-parole period of 17 years.

Lundy's brother Craig, who gave evidence at the trial, publicly stated that he believed Lundy was guilty, while his sister and brother-in-law claimed his innocence.

Appeals

Court of Appeal 
Lundy unsuccessfully appealed to the Court of Appeal in 2002, and the appeal resulted in his non-parole period being increased from 17 years to 20 years.

Privy Council 
In November 2012, Lundy applied to the Judicial Committee of the Privy Council seeking permission to appeal his murder convictions. The appeal was based on three issues: the time of death, the time of shutdown of Christine's computer, and the presence of brain tissue on Lundy's shirt. The hearing before the Privy Council (including Chief Justice of New Zealand Dame Sian Elias) began on 17 June 2013, with possible decisions being to reject the appeal, thus affirming Lundy's convictions and sentence; to overturn the convictions and order a new trial; or to send the case back to the Court of Appeal in New Zealand for determination. The Privy Council reserved its decision after the three day hearing. On 4 October 2013, the Privy Council upheld Lundy's appeal against his double murder convictions and quashed them, ordering a retrial. It concluded that Lundy's convictions were "unsafe" in light of new evidence that had been presented. Mark Lundy was released from prison under probation orders on 5 October 2013 pending a second trial.

Second trial 
In 2015 Lundy was tried a second time. The Crown case was led by Philip Morgan QC. The defence was led by David Hislop QC. The Crown made significant changes to the prosecution case against Lundy following the ruling of the Privy Council. They no longer claimed that Lundy made a 300km round trip from Petone to Palmerston North in less than three hours to commit the murders. Instead, they argued Lundy drove up to Palmerston North in the middle of the night after he had been with the prostitute. 

The jury also heard about scientific tests which were conducted on tissue found on one of Lundy's shirts. The Crown claimed the stains were brain or spinal cord matter from Christine while the defence argued they could have been stains from a meat pie. The tests were developed specifically for the Lundy case by a laboratory in the Netherlands and  have not been used since. The prosecution claimed the tests proved the tissue was human. 

The jury deliberated for over sixteen hours after which, on 1 April, Lundy was again found guilty.

Second Appeal
In October 2017, Lundy appealed his second conviction at the Court of Appeal in Wellington. Lundy was represented in the Court of Appeal by Jonathan Eaton QC, Julie-Anne Kincade, Jack Oliver-Hood and Helen Coutts. The Court of Appeal dismissed the appeal in October 2018. It ruled that the Crown evidence about RNA (the alleged presence of brain tissue on Lundy's shirt and similar to DNA) in the retrial was inadmissible but decided the appeal should be dismissed "on the basis that no substantial miscarriage of justice has actually occurred."

Supreme Court 
Lundy was found guilty in the second trial after the results of two different tests, immunohistochemistry [IHC] and mRNA, conducted on tissue found on one of his shirts were presented to the jury. The Court of Appeal subsequently ruled this evidence was novel science that had never been used before, or since, and should not have been presented to the jury – but upheld Lundy's convictions anyway. This was the 'proviso', the mechanism that allowed the Court of Appeal to dismiss Lundy's appeal.  Lundy's lawyer, Jonathan Eaton QC, then argued to the Supreme Court that Lundy had become the victim of 'junk science' and in May 2019, he was granted leave to have his appeal heard by the Supreme Court - solely on the proviso argument. 

On 20 December 2019, the Supreme Court of New Zealand dismissed Lundy's appeal, stating in its concluding paragraph that "The other evidence establishes beyond reasonable doubt that Mr Lundy murdered Christine and Amber Lundy."

Other theories of the murders 
Geoff Levick, who runs a campaign to have Lundy's convictions overturned, believed Lundy was innocent largely based on the time needed to travel from Petone to Lundy's house and return. He speculated that a creditor of Lundy paid someone to go to Lundy's house to "teach him a lesson", but Lundy was not there and matters "got out of hand".

In 2009, North & South magazine published the results of an investigation into the case by Mike White titled The Lundy murders: what the jury didn't hear. In order to make it back to Petone by 8.28 pm, Lundy would have had to drive to Palmerston North in rush hour traffic at an average speed of around 117 km/h (73 mph; the maximum open road speed limit in New Zealand at the time was 100 km/h, 62 mph), commit the crimes, and make the return journey back to Petone at an average speed of 120 km/h (75 mph).

In 2012, documentary film maker, Bryan Bruce made an episode examining the Lundy case as part of his series The Investigator.  Like others, Bruce believed that Lundy could not possibly have made the return trip in three hours, but he thought Lundy could have made the trip and committed the crimes later that night, returning to Petone in the early hours of the morning.

Lundy 500 
In July 2009, Jackson Wood, editor of Victoria University student magazine Salient, announced the "Lundy 500", an event whereby teams of vehicles would travel from Petone to Palmerston North. Participants were tasked with doing the trip in 68 minutes or less, the same time Lundy was argued to have driven the distance. Wood argued that the "event was designed to draw attention to some of the inconsistencies in the New Zealand legal system", and emphasised that he wasn't encouraging anyone to break the law. However, the proposed event was harshly criticised in the media, and on 2 August it was announced that the event was to be cancelled. Wood apologised to the Lundy family and wrote that: "He acknowledged that their viewpoints were not adequately taken into account before the event was announced on Friday, and that there were other ways for this point to be communicated".

A similar re-enactment of the travel involved in the Lundy case, dubbed the "Lundy Three Hundy" was proposed in 2013 by Nic Miller. It was likewise criticised in the media, with Mathew Grocott writing that "this event should not go ahead and if those involved have any human decency then it won't go ahead."

See also
 Bain family murders

References

External links
Beyond the Darklands - Mark Lundy - Series 3, Episode 4
Lundy's Last Chance? Article in North & South magazine from 10 December 2012

2000 murders in New Zealand
Murder in New Zealand
People murdered in New Zealand
Lundy, Amber
Overturned convictions in New Zealand
Incidents of violence against girls